Nuraminis, Nuràminis in sardinian language,  is a comune (municipality) in the Province of South Sardinia in the Italian region Sardinia, located about  northwest of Cagliari.

The municipality of Nuraminis contains the frazione (subdivision) Villagreca.

Nuraminis borders the following municipalities: Monastir, Samatzai, Serramanna, Serrenti, Ussana, Villasor.

Demographic evolution

References 

Cities and towns in Sardinia